Adam Van Doren is an American watercolorist, author, and documentary filmmaker.

Biography 
Van Doren grew up in Cambridge, Massachusetts and Chicago. He comes from a long line of academics and literary figures: his grandfather was Pulitzer Prize-winning poet and Columbia University professor Mark Van Doren, and his grandmother was Dorothy Van Doren, a longtime editor of The Nation. His great-uncle was Carl Van Doren, a Pulitzer Prize-winning critic and biographer who married New York Herald Tribune's book review editor Irita Bradford Van Doren. His uncle, Charles Van Doren, was an editor of Encyclopædia Britannica, Inc. and was a former quiz show celebrity implicated in the 1950s quiz show scandals and was dramatized in the movie 1994 Quiz Show. His father, John Van Doren, was also an editor at Encyclopædia Britannica, Inc. and edited its annual “The Great Ideas Today” section, and his mother, Mira Jedwabnik Van Doren, is an artist. His extended family include poet Sally Van Doren, who is married to his cousin John Van Doren, son of Charles.

He received a B.A. from Columbia University and a M.Arch. from Columbia Graduate School of Architecture, Planning and Preservation, where he studied under Robert A. M. Stern and was trained in the Beaux-Arts tradition, which influenced his later painting career. He spent two summers in Venice living in John Ruskin's former house studying painting. His artwork has focused on landscapes and classical architecture of New England, New York City and Italy. He also made three documentaries, on his grandfather Mark, on cartoonist James Thurber and on Harold Ross who co-founded The New Yorker.

Van Doren also teaches at Yale University, where he is an associate fellow. He also published a collection of his watercolor drawings of the Yale University campus.

Van Doren divides his time between Cornwall, Connecticut, and New York City. He owns a studio on 130 West 57th Street that was once occupied by Childe Hassam and Charles Baskerville. The series premiere of the HBO series Mad Men, "Smoke Gets in Your Eyes," and a scene from the TV series Players was partially filmed in his studio.

Personal life and family 
In 1991, Van Doren married Charlotte Sonnenblick, daughter of noted cardiologist Edmund Sonnenblick and granddaughter of industrialist Chester Bland, who served as president of Colt's Manufacturing Company.

References 

Living people
Yale University faculty
American watercolorists
Columbia College (New York) alumni
Columbia Graduate School of Architecture, Planning and Preservation alumni
American documentary filmmakers
Van Doren family
Year of birth missing (living people)